River Pool may refer to:

River Pool, Cumbria
River Pool (London)

See also 
Poole River, a tributary of the Ortoire River in Trinidad.